Hermit Canyon is a north-trending canyon in western Grand Canyon, about 6.0 miles in length, below the South Rim. It is named for the hermit who built Hermit Camp, at the Colorado River, Louis D. Boucher. Hermit Canyon's east flank is bordered by Pima Point of the South Rim (about at the canyon midpoint), and Pima Point is ~2.0  from the Hermit Canyon midline. Pima Point is about 3.5 miles west-northwest of Grand Canyon Village, and the South Rim at Pima Point trends southward, as the start of Western Grand Canyon; it also marks the terminus of the West Rim Road.

Hermit Canyon contains the Hermit Basin at its southern end, with Dripping Springs (and Dripping Springs Trail to the west). The Hermit Trail traverses the east flank of Hermit Canyon down to the Colorado River, where it intersects the Tonto Trail at Cope Butte. At the end of Hermit Creek, and Canyon, the Hermit Rapids interrupt the flow of the Colorado River. Historic Hermit Camp was located at the end of the Hermit Trail, near the Colorado River.

Gallery

See also
 Hermits Rest
 Geology of the Grand Canyon area

References

External links

 Aerial view, Hermit Trail (east-flank, Hermit Canyon, Mountainzone.com
 Coconino Sandstone Trackway, scaled with human hand

Grand Canyon
Grand Canyon National Park
Canyons and gorges of Arizona
Grand Canyon, South Rim
Grand Canyon, South Rim (west)